Stuart Frederick Shephard (born 20 August 1971)  is an English former cricketer.

Shephard was born at Birmingham in August 1971 and was educated in the city at King Edward VI Camp Hill School for Boys, a top Grammar school in his home suburb of Kings Heath, Birmingham.  While studying at Loughborough University, he played for the Combined Universities cricket team. He made a single appearance in first-class cricket for the team against the touring Australians at Oxford in 1993. Batting twice in the match, he was dismissed for 5 runs in the Combined Universities first-innings by Brendon Julian, while in their second-innings he was dismissed without scoring by Shane Warne. In addition to playing first-class cricket for the Combined Universities, Shephard also made five appearances in List A one-day cricket for the team, making four appearances in the 1992 Benson & Hedges Cup and a single appearance in the 1993 Benson & Hedges Cup. He later played minor counties cricket for the Warwickshire Cricket Board in MCCA Knockout Trophy in 1998 and 1999. His twin brother, Gavin, also played cricket at List A level. He is currently a teacher at King Edward VI Five Ways School, another top Grammar school in Birmingham.

References

External links

1971 births
Living people
Cricketers from Birmingham, West Midlands
People educated at King Edward's School, Birmingham
English cricketers
British Universities cricketers
Warwickshire Cricket Board cricketers
English twins
Twin sportspeople
English cricketers of 1969 to 2000